Walter Sandys may refer to:
 Walter Sandys (died 1435), High Sheriff of Hampshire 1410–11 and 1423–24, MP for Hampshire
 Walter Sandys (died 1609), High Sheriff of Hampshire 1576–77 and 1591–92, MP for Stockbridge

See also
 Sandys (surname)